Flora Gasser (November 28, 1932 – November 19, 2022) was a Filipino veteran film and television actress.

Gasser started an acting career in the 70s. She is best known as "The Yaya of Philippine Television" for her roles in films such as Batang Z (1996), Joey Boy Munti: 15 Anyos Ka sa Muntinglupa (1991) and Kumander Bawang: Kalaban ng Mga Aswang (1988). 

Gasser died on 19 November 2022, at the age of 89.

Filmography

Film

References

External links
 

1932 births
2022 deaths
Filipino actresses